Ryder Glacier, is one of the major glaciers in northern Greenland. 

This glacier was first mapped by Lauge Koch in 1917 during Knud Rasmussen's 1916-1918 Second Thule Expedition to north Greenland and was named after Danish Arctic explorer Carl Ryder.

Geography 
The Ryder Glacier originates in the Greenland Ice Cap. It is roughly north–south oriented and has its terminus at the head of the Sherard Osborn Fjord between Permin Land and Warming Land. It is 30 km long and is a floating tongue within the fjord.

Bibliography
Anthony K. Higgins, North Greenland Glacier Velocities and Calf Ice Production

See also
List of glaciers in Greenland

References

External links
A Mini-Surge on the Ryder Glacier, Greenland, Observed by Satellite Radar Interferometry
Arctic Sea Ice Forum
Glaciers of Greenland